The 1969 Spanish Grand Prix was a Formula One motor race held at the Montjuïc circuit on 4 May 1969. It was race 2 of 11 in both the 1969 World Championship of Drivers and the 1969 International Cup for Formula One Manufacturers.

This is one of only two Grands Prix where the winner finished two laps ahead of the runner-up, the other occasion being the 1995 Australian Grand Prix. This was the last race of the high wing era in Formula One. Both works Lotus cars suffered massive accidents when their suspension-mounted wing supports failed. Despite the narrow confines of the Montjuïc circuit, drivers Jochen Rindt and Graham Hill both survived. Chris Amon inherited the lead after Rindt's crash. Establishing a thirty-second lead, the New Zealander seemed to be on his way to his first Grand Prix victory until his engine seized on lap 56. The lead was then gifted to Jackie Stewart, who then went on to win by a margin of two laps; one of his most dominant performances, on a circuit that would become synonymous with the danger and lack of professionalism he detested.

Classification

Qualifying

Race

Championship standings after the race

Drivers' Championship standings

Constructors' Championship standings

Note: Only the top five positions are included for both sets of standings.

References

Further reading

Spanish Grand Prix
Spanish Grand Prix
1969 in Spanish motorsport
Spanish